The N-10 or National Highway 10 is a 653 km national highway in Pakistan which extends along Pakistan's Arabian Sea coast from Karachi in Sindh province to Gwadar in Balochistan province. It passes the towns of Ormara and Pasni.

Background 
The idea of exploiting the potential of the large coastal belt was under discussion for a long time. The decision to build a port in Gwadar was initially taken in the early 1990s when the hydrocarbon-laden and mineral-rich Central Asian Republics gained independence after the breakup of the Soviet Union. The construction of the Makran Coastal Highway was essential to the development of the port of Gwadar. Without the Highway, Gwadar would have been an island sitting without the bridges that connect it with Karachi in the south and the rest of Pakistan and the larger world around in the north and the west. Another key connection of an established infrastructure in this part of the country: it offers China a potential alternative to the vulnerable choke points in the Malacca straits.

Prior to the construction of the Makran Coastal Highway in 2004, Karachi was linked to Gwadar via an uncarpeted "jeep" or "dirt" track. The journey between Karachi and Gwadar used to take at least two days and took a heavy toll on the "wear and tear" of vehicles. It was considered preferable to take the safer but longer route via Quetta.

After completion of the Makran Coastal Highway, the average journey time between Karachi and Gwadar has been reduced to only 6 to 7 hours and transportation costs have also been reduced.

The Makran Coastal Highway was planned and built by the Government of Pakistan with the following objectives:

 To develop infrastructure and boost economic activity in the areas along Pakistan's coastline
 To improve the transportation and communications infrastructure in Balochistan province
 To develop the coastal towns of Ormara, Pasni and Gwadar into major port cities
 To link Ormara, Pasni and Gwadar with the rest of Pakistan's national highways network
 To develop the seafood industry along Pakistan's coastline by reducing the time and costs involved in transporting fresh seafood from seafood catchment areas to major cities in Pakistan as well as export processing zones in Karachi and Gwadar

Construction 

The construction contract for the Makran Coastal Highway was awarded to Pakistan's Frontier Works Organisation (FWO), which built the Karakorum Highway.

Construction work on the Makran Coastal Highway Project commenced in 2002 and was completed by 14 December 2004, in a period of three years.

Management and maintenance 

The Makran Coastal Highway is managed and maintained by Pakistan's National Highway Authority.

Gallery

See also 
 National Highways of Pakistan
 Motorways of Pakistan
 Transport in Pakistan

References

External links 

 National Highway Authority
 Frontier Works Organization

N-10
N-10
Transport in Balochistan, Pakistan
Transport in Sindh
Gwadar District
Roads in Balochistan, Pakistan